West Township is a township in Huntingdon County, Pennsylvania, United States.  The population was 521 at the 2020 census.

Geography
According to the United States Census Bureau, the township has a total area of 31.0 square miles (80.3 km), of which 31.0 square miles (80.3 km)  is land and 0.04 square mile (0.1 km)  (0.06%) is water.

Demographics

As of the census of 2000, there were 528 people, 203 households, and 155 families residing in the township.  The population density was 17.0 people per square mile (6.6/km).  There were 287 housing units at an average density of 9.3/sq mi (3.6/km).  The racial makeup of the township was 99.24% White, 0.19% Native American, 0.19% Asian, 0.38% from other races.

There were 203 households, out of which 30.0% had children under the age of 18 living with them, 70.4% were married couples living together, 3.9% had a female householder with no husband present, and 23.2% were non-families. 21.2% of all households were made up of individuals, and 8.4% had someone living alone who was 65 years of age or older.  The average household size was 2.60 and the average family size was 3.04.

In the township the population was spread out, with 22.3% under the age of 18, 9.5% from 18 to 24, 28.2% from 25 to 44, 26.5% from 45 to 64, and 13.4% who were 65 years of age or older.  The median age was 38 years. For every 100 females, there were 97.8 males.  For every 100 females age 18 and over, there were 102.0 males.

The median income for a household in the township was $37,917, and the median income for a family was $43,672. Males had a median income of $29,271 versus $21,250 for females. The per capita income for the township was $17,910.  About 4.4% of families and 7.4% of the population were below the poverty line, including 8.1% of those under age 18 and 18.3% of those age 65 or over.

References

Townships in Huntingdon County, Pennsylvania
Townships in Pennsylvania